The Mecklenburg Class G 4.2 operated by the Grand Duchy of Mecklenburg Friedrich-Franz Railway was a goods train, steam locomotive with a compound engine. It was procured between 1901 and 1905 from Henschel and Linke
based on the Prussian G 4.2 prototype. A total of five machines were built for Mecklenburg. It was planned that they would be taken over by the Deutsche Reichsbahn and were to have been given numbers 53 401 to 53 405 according to the 1923 provisional DRG renumbering plan. But they were retired by 1924 before the final plan was issued.

The vehicles were equipped with a Hartmann steam brake and had inside Allan valve gear.

In 1920 a G 4.2 was transferred from Prussia to Mecklenburg. It was given running no. 406 and would have become DRG 53 451.

See also 
 Grand Duchy of Mecklenburg Friedrich-Franz Railway
 List of Mecklenburg locomotives

References 

0-6-0 locomotives
G04.2
C n2v locomotives

de:Preußische G 4.2#G 4.2 bei der Mecklenburgischen Friedrich-Franz-Eisenbahn
Freight locomotives